Jalla! Jalla! is a Swedish comedy film, which was released to cinemas in Sweden on the 22nd of December 2000 directed by Josef Fares and starring Fares Fares, Torkel Petersson, Tuva Novotny and Laleh Pourkarim as the main roles. It was the debut film by Josef Fares and one of his most well-known. The film received eight nominations and won four, including Best Film.

“Jalla! Jalla!” is Arabic for “Come on!” or “Hurry up!”.

Plot
Roro (Fares Fares) and Måns (Torkel Petersson) who are best friends, work at the park management and get to do all the menial jobs - clean up duck ponds and pick up dog poop. Roro's Swedish girlfriend Lisa (Tuva Novotny) wants to be introduced to his family but he refuses for a long time because of his Lebanese family traditions. When Roro finally decides to introduce Lisa to his family, he walks into the apartment full of relatives who are planning a marriage with the Lebanese girl Yasmine (Laleh Pourkarim).

Soundtrack 
Daniel Lemma was contacted by Josef Fares to work on the movie's score.

References

External links

2000 films
2000 romantic comedy-drama films
Swedish romantic comedy-drama films
Films directed by Josef Fares
2000 comedy films
2000 drama films
2000s Swedish films